Sedan Synagogue, located on Avenue Philippoteaux, Sedan, Ardennes, Northern France, was built by the Jewish community in 1878. Although the Jews were deported during World War II, the synagogue survived.

History

In the early 19th century, the Jewish community of Sedan was small and apartments like that of the Salomon-Créhange family on Saint-Michel Street were used as synagogue.
By the end of the 19th century the Jewish community has grown and in 1878 a new synagogue was built, designed by architect Mazuel. The site was near Basse des Remparts Street, between the Bastions de Bourbon and the Turenne that had been cleared to make place for Philippoteaux Avenue.
During World War II many Jews from Sedan were sent to the concentration camps. In 1962, at the end of the Algerian War, repatriation to France helped enlarge the Jewish community of Sedan.
Later economic factors caused a shift of populations towards the big cities, notably Paris, and the Jewish community of Sedan dwindled. Some Jews also emigrated to Israel.

Gallery

External links
La Synagogue, École de Résidence

Synagogues in France
Synagogues completed in 1878
Buildings and structures in Ardennes (department)
Tourist attractions in Ardennes (department)